Fernando Alberto García Cuevas (born 2 April 1953) is a Mexican politician affiliated with the Institutional Revolutionary Party. As of 2014 he served as Deputy of the LIX Legislature of the Mexican Congress representing the State of Mexico.

References

1953 births
Living people
People from Mexico City
Members of the Chamber of Deputies (Mexico)
Institutional Revolutionary Party politicians